Phool may refer to:

 Phool (1945 film), a Bollywood film
 Phool (1993 film), a Bollywood film directed by Singeetam Srinivasa Rao
 Phool (magazine), an Urdu-language Pakistani children's magazine

See also